Stéphane Julien (born April 7, 1974) is a French-Canadian former professional ice hockey defenceman.

He last skated with EHC München in the Deutsche Eishockey Liga (DEL) during the 2011-12 season.

Career statistics

References

External links

1974 births
Living people
Canadian ice hockey defencemen
EHC München players
Montreal Roadrunners players
Sherbrooke Phoenix coaches
Canadian expatriate ice hockey players in Germany
Canadian ice hockey coaches